The 1934 Oklahoma gubernatorial election was held on November 6, 1934, and was a race for Governor of Oklahoma. Democrat  E. W. Marland defeated Republican William B. Pine.  Also on the ballot were S. P. Green of the Socialist Party, Francis M. Simpson of the Progressive Party and four Independent candidates: Geo. G. Ison, Joseph Prather Wheat, Dan W. Womack, and John Franing.

Democratic primary
Fifteen candidates sought the Democratic nomination, including former governor Jack C. Walton, Lt. Governor Robert Burns, and Attorney General J. Berry King.  Ponca City oilman E. W. Marland and Tom Anglin of Holdenville were headed to a runoff when Anglin withdrew, making Marland the nominee.

Results

Republican primary
Former Senator William B. Pine defeated two challengers by a wide margin to claim the GOP nomination.

Results

Results

References

1934
Gubernatorial
Okla